The Martin 16 is a Canadian trailerable sailboat, that was designed by Don Martin of Vancouver, British Columbia, specifically as a boat for disabled sailors. It was first built in 1995.

Production
The boat was first built in 1995 by Martin Yachts, who completed 58 examples. Production then passed to Abbott Boats in Sarnia, Ontario, Canada, who built a further 55 boats. The original molds were destroyed in a fire in 2006, but a new set were built in 2009 and production was restarted by KAPE Boatworks of Mississauga, Ontario. The design remains in production.

Design

The Martin 16 is a small recreational keelboat, built predominantly of fiberglass. It has a fractional sloop rig, a transom-hung rudder and a lifting weighted bulb keel. It displaces  and carries  of lead ballast. Both the mainsail and the jib are mounted with booms.

Martin 16 sailors sit on a seat facing forward and all controls and lines are led to the cockpit to allow sailing without having to leave the seat. The rudder is controlled with a joystick. There is a second seat behind the command seat for a passenger or instructor. With the keel extended the boat cannot be tipped.

The boat is sailed like a dinghy and does not have provisions for an outboard motor.

Operational history
A fleet of Martin 16s is operated by Nepean Sailing Club in Ottawa, Ontario, Canada and used as the training and racing boat for their Able Sail program for disabled sailors.

A similar fleet of Martin 16s has been used by Challenged Sailors San Diego from Harbor Island for their disabled sailor programming.

See also
List of sailing boat types

Similar sailboats
Balboa 16
Catalina 16.5
DS-16
Laguna 16
Leeward 16
Nordica 16
Tanzer 16
Twitchell 12

References

External links

Keelboats
1990s sailboat type designs
Sailing yachts
Trailer sailers
Sailboat type designs by Don Martin
Sailboat types built by Martin Yachts
Sailboat types built by Abbott Boats
Sailboat types built by KAPE Boatworks